Madagasikara may be:
The Malagasy name for Madagascar
Madagasikara (gastropod), an animal genus